O Carnaval Cantado de 1932 (English: The 1932 Rio Carnival in Song) is a 1932 Brazilian film produced and directed by Vital Ramos de Castro. It is believed to be a lost film.

Musical numbers
 "Bamboleô"
 Music by André Filho
 Performed by Carmen Miranda

References

External links

1932 musical comedy films
1932 films
Brazilian musical comedy films
1930s Portuguese-language films
Films set in Rio de Janeiro (city)
Lost Brazilian films
Brazilian black-and-white films
1932 lost films
Lost musical comedy films